Bishop Township is one of fifteen townships in Effingham County, Illinois, USA.  As of the 2010 census, its population was 1,408 and it contained 503 housing units.

Geography

Cities, towns, villages
 Dieterich

Extinct towns
 Elliottstown

Cemeteries
The township contains these five cemeteries: Dieterich, Immaculate Conception, King, Saint Aloysius and Saint John Lutheran.

Major highways
  Illinois Route 33

Demographics

School districts
 Dieterich Community Unit School District 30
 Teutopolis Community Unit School District 50

Political districts
 Illinois' 19th congressional district
 State House District 108
 State Senate District 54

References
 
 United States Census Bureau 2007 TIGER/Line Shapefiles
 United States National Atlas

External links
 City-Data.com
 Illinois State Archives

Townships in Effingham County, Illinois
1860 establishments in Illinois
Populated places established in 1860
Townships in Illinois